Royal Park is located in the western suburbs of Adelaide. It is home to a large Polish community, as evidenced by the establishment of St Stanislaus of Cracow Catholic Church. Other ethnic groups represented include Italian, Croatian, Bosnian, Irish, Macedonian and Greek.  At that time there was still a tribe of Aborigines living around the wetlands west of Royal Park that is now the suburb of West Lakes. In the 1950s a few streets at the southern end of Royal Park were allocated for Government Public Housing developments through the South Australian Housing Trust. In recent years, there has been large-scale re-developments that include private housing and a soon-to-be-built retirement village.

Community

Parks and reserves
 Carnegie North Reserve
 Cooke Reserve
 Fisher Reserve
 Royal Reserve

Schools
 Hendon Primary School
 Royal Park High School - opened 1971; name changed to West Lakes High School, 1978; closed 1991.

Streets
 Allan Street
 North Parade

Shops
 Browse In & Save (26 Tapleys Hill Road)
 BWS
 Drake's Foodland

Businesses
 Clean Seas is headquartered here.

References

Suburbs of Adelaide
Polish-Australian culture